Helle Genie Virkner née Lotinga (15 September 1925 – 10 June 2009) was a Danish actress, author and spouse of Prime Minister Jens Otto Krag

Personal life 
Helle Genie Lotinga was born in Aarhus to Jewish rentier Moritz “Morris” Lotinga and Ellen Larsine (née Rasmussen) Her parents divorced when she was 5, at which point she moved with her mother from Ry to Copenhagen. Her paternal family escaped to Sweden in 1943. Helle changed her last name from Lotinga to Virkner in 1944.

Helle Virkner was married three times. First to actor William Rosenberg (1920–2014), then to actor Ebbe Rode (1910–1998). Her third marriage was to Danish Prime Minister Jens Otto Krag (1914–1978), with whom she had two children. Her daughter Astrid Helene 'Søsser' Krag, a journalist and former model, died on 5 July 2014, 51 years old. Helle and Søsser lived together in Charlottenlund in the last years of Helle's life.

Career 
Virkner's career began in 1944, and two years later she appeared at the Royal Theatre. She eventually left her mark on the acting scene in a string of popular films and television series, including a significant role as Elisabeth Friis in the Danish TV series Matador. Her career ended in 2003.

Death 
She died at her home in the Copenhagen suburb of Charlottenlund, from cancer, aged 83.

Filmography 

  – 1944
 Otte akkorder – 1944
  – 1944
 Så mødes vi hos Tove – 1946
 My name is Petersen – 1947
  – 1947
  – 1948
  – 1948
  – 1949
 Solstik – 1953
 Hendes store aften – 1954
  – 1954
  – 1955
 På tro og love – 1955
 Kispus – 1956
  – 1956
  – 1957
 Englen i sort – 1957
  – 1958
  – 1958
 Poeten og Lillemor – 1959
 Tre må man være – 1959
 Onkel Bill fra New York – 1959
 Poeten og Lillemor og Lotte – 1960
 Cirkus Buster – 1961
 Poeten og Lillemor i forårshumør – 1961
 Støv på hjernen – 1961
 Det støver stadig – 1962
 Den kære familie – 1962
 Støv for alle pengene – 1963
 Peters landlov – 1963
 Døden kommer til middag – 1964
 Landmandsliv – 1965
 Passer passer piger – 1965
  – 1965
  – 1966
  – 1968
 The Only Way – 1970
 Rend mig i revolutionen – 1970
  – 1971
 Olsen-banden i Jylland – 1971
 Ballade på Christianshavn – 1971
 Olsen-bandens store kup – 1972
 Olsen-banden går amok – 1973
 Nitten røde roser – 1974
  – 1976
 Pas på ryggen, professor – 1977
 Matador (TV series) – 1978–81
  – 1983
 Riget 1 – 1994
 Riget 2 – 1997
 Blinkende lygter – 2000
  – 2001
  – 2003

References

External links 
 

1925 births
2009 deaths
Best Actress Bodil Award winners
Bodil Honorary Award recipients
Danish film actresses
Danish television actresses
Deaths from cancer in Denmark
People from Aarhus
Spouses of prime ministers of Denmark
Danish people of Jewish descent